The 1947 Idaho Vandals football team represented the University of Idaho in the 1947 college football season. The Vandals were led by first-year head coach Dixie Howell, and were members of the Pacific Coast Conference. Home games were played on campus in Moscow at Neale Stadium, with one game in Boise at Public School Field. The Vandals were 4–4 overall and 1–4 in conference play.

Howell, age 34, had been the head coach at Arizona State before the war and was a finalist for the Idaho job six years earlier in 1941, which went to Francis Schmidt. He played with Don Hutson and Bear Bryant at Alabama, and was the passer and a consensus All-American on the undefeated 1934 team that won the Rose Bowl and the national title.

Season
Led on the field by  26-year-old passing halfback Billy (The Rifle) Williams, Idaho compiled a  overall record.

After a  season the previous year, Stanford fielded one of its poorest teams in 1947 and went winless  (They have met only once since, Stanford crushed Idaho 63–0 two years later in 1949.)

At the time, it was thought to be the first Idaho football win over a California school in the PCC, and 5,000 greeted the team at the Moscow train station on Monday morning; classes were canceled and the public schools were closed. It was actually the second win, as first-year member UCLA lost in Moscow in 1928. But it stands as the only road win and the most recent overall, as Idaho has not defeated any of the four California schools of the present-day  in football since then, with winless all-time records against  and California 

The next week, the undefeated Vandals suffered a nineteenth straight loss in the Battle of the Palouse with neighbor Washington State, falling  at homecoming in Moscow. With the excitement after the win at Stanford, the game at Neale Stadium drew an overflow attendance of 22,500, then a record gathering of any kind for the Palouse and the state of Idaho.

The road victory over Stanford was Idaho's only win in the PCC in 1947, and struggled on offense with just thirteen points scored in their four losses. That included a humbling  shutout at home to Montana for the Little Brown Stein on a Friday afternoon in November; the Grizzlies had also won with a shutout the previous year,  in Missoula.

Following the war and the single-win seasons of the previous two years, the 1947 team had the best record since 1938. Despite the improvement, it was Howell's best season at Idaho and a winning football season was still sixteen years away; the 1963 team went  under  (with the final game canceled). In between, two seasons also had even .500 records: 1952 and 1957.

Schedule

 One game was played on Friday (Montana at Moscow)

All-conference
No Vandals were named to the All-Coast team; halfback Billy Williams was named to the third team. Honorable mention were end Orville Barnes, tackle Will Overgaard, and guard Jack Dana.

NFL Draft
One senior from the 1947 Vandals was selected in the 1948 NFL Draft:

Two sophomores were selected in the 1950 NFL Draft:

List of Idaho Vandals in the NFL Draft

References

External links
Gem of the Mountains: 1948 University of Idaho yearbook – 1947 football season
Go Mighty Vandals – 1947 football season
WSU Libraries: Game video (color) – Washington State at Idaho – October 4, 1947
Idaho Argonaut – student newspaper – 1947 editions

Idaho
Idaho Vandals football seasons
Idaho Vandals football